Feiyun River is the third longest river in Zhejiang, China. It has an average annual flow of 144 cubic meters per second.

References

Rivers of Zhejiang